Wynn is an unincorporated community in Campbell County, Tennessee, United States.

Notes

Unincorporated communities in Campbell County, Tennessee
Unincorporated communities in Tennessee